Electoral district of Campbelltown, an electoral district of the Legislative Assembly in the Australian state of New South Wales, has had one incarnation, from 1968 to the present.


Members

Election results

Elections in the 2010s

2019

2015

2011

Elections in the 2000s

2007

2003

2001 by-election

Elections in the 1990s

1999

1995

1991

Elections in the 1980s

1988

1984

1981

Elections in the 1970s

1978

1976

1973

1971

Elections in the 1960s

1968

References

New South Wales state electoral results by district